Dairylea may refer to:

 Dairylea (cheese), a brand of cheese products produced by Mondelēz International in the UK and Ireland
 Dairylea Cooperative Inc., a large, regional milk cooperative located in Syracuse NY, USA
 Dairylea Lunchables